The Nissan Fuga (Japanese: 日産・フーガ Nissan Fūga) is a mid-size luxury sedan produced by Japanese automaker Nissan since October 2004. It is built on a wider, stretched wheelbase version of the Nissan FM platform. After the Nissan Cima and Nissan President were discontinued in August 2010, the Fuga became Nissan's flagship vehicle. In North America and Europe, the Fuga is sold as the second and third-generation Infiniti M (Q70 from 2014), where it has been the flagship of the Infiniti luxury division of Nissan since 2006.

First shown as the Fuga Concept at the 2003 Tokyo Motor Show, the F51 replaced the long-running Nissan Cedric, Gloria, Cima and President. The name derives from the Italian fuga, for fugue, the musical composition form.

First generation (Y50; 2004)

When the Prince (Nissan) Gloria was first introduced in 1959, it was based on a stretched version of the original Prince (Nissan) Skyline, which was first introduced in 1957. Nissan used this approach again for the Fuga, using the Skyline platform again. The Fuga was available at Japanese Nissan dealerships called Nissan Red Stage and Nissan Blue Stage until Blue Stage and Red Stage dealerships were combined into one Japanese Nissan dealership network utilized internationally in 2005.

Nissan wanted to create a fresh approach started by the Cedric/Gloria and focus its efforts to compete with European executive mid-sized sports sedans, such as the BMW 5 series, Audi A6, Mercedes-Benz E-Class and Jaguar S-Type. The Fuga's primary competitor is the Toyota Crown Athlete Series, but also competes with the Lexus GS, as well as Honda Legend.

The Fuga trim levels began with "XV" and ended with "GT" as the top trim package, equivalent to the previous "Brougham" and "Gran Turismo" versions of the Cedric and Gloria.

In markets outside Japan it is sold as the second-generation Infiniti M (M35/45). The Infiniti M became the flagship of the Infiniti luxury division after the 2006 model year, as the Infiniti Q (the Cima's counterpart in certain markets) was discontinued. However the Cima would remain in production for the Japanese domestic market and it is  longer than the Fuga which slots below it in the lineup.

The Fuga is also used as an uplevel taxi in Japan.

Mitsuoka Motors, a small Japanese automobile company, uses the Nissan Fuga as a base for their Galue-III luxury sedan which has been produced since 2005.

Equipment
Aluminium is used in the body, hood, trunk lid and door internal structure to reduce weight. The front suspension uses a double wishbone setup, also to reduce unsprung weight, and to improve vehicle handling. This type of suspension was previously used on the Cedric/Gloria until 1983, when that platform began to use MacPherson struts for the front suspension, but still uses the multilink rear suspension which was introduced on the Cedric/Gloria in 1979. The Fuga uses aluminum alloy extensively in both the front and rear suspension components.

The GT sports package includes Nissan's 4WS version of HICAS to improve stability and handling, taking advantage of the 53:47 weight distribution.

A driver aid system used in Japan, called Distance Control Assistance, pushes the gas pedal against the foot when the DVD navigation with GPS determines that an unsafe speed is being maintained. If the Autonomous cruise control system is being used, the Distance Control Assistance will reduce speed automatically, and will warn the driver that an adjustment is being made with an audible bell sound.

Body styles

Engines

Specifications

Marketing
When the Fuga was first introduced for sale October 14, 2004 the advertising campaign used a musical work in the fugue style. The work is titled "Vortex", composed and arranged by Akihiko Matsumoto, and was specially commissioned for Nissan. The music was played in three movements by a full orchestra for 7 minutes and 42 seconds, and a recording was given to dealers in Japan as a promotional DVD-CD gift for customers called "Fuga The Movie and Premium Soundtrack", free of charge.

The DVD and CD package was not available for private sale, with the DVD providing a gallery of images, and descriptions of key technologies such as how the adaptive cruise control functions, various safety technologies like the Blind Spot camera, which is a camera installed on the passenger side side view mirror displaying a view of the curb on the in-dash monitor, and a movie with the Fuga on a mountain road, using the "Vortex" soundtrack. The DVD is recorded in Dolby 5.1 surround sound.

Second generation (Y51; 2009)

The second generation Nissan Fuga, introduced as the Infiniti M, was previewed at the 2009 Pebble Beach Concours d'Elegance. The new Fuga debuted at the 2009 Tokyo Motor Show. The production version went on sale across Japan starting on December 21, 2009. It is sold in overseas markets under the Infiniti nameplate as the third-generation M (M37/M56/35h/30d). The second generation Fuga's body design (styled by Hideo Komuro in 2007), took on a more organic look. and was a resurrection of a 1960s and 1970s appearance called "coke bottle styling" that was used on the 1970s Nissan Cedric and Nissan Gloria.

In August 2010, the Fuga became Nissan's flagship with the announcement of the cancellation of the Nissan Cima and the Nissan President. When the Fuga assumed the role as flagship sedan of Nissan Japan August 2010, it became the first time that Nissan didn't sell a premium luxury V8 sedan in Japan; the Fuga's North American cousin, the Infiniti M56, is offered with a V8 shared with the Infiniti QX56.

World first Wrong-way driving warning debuted on the Fuga hybrid in 2010.

The VK45DE V8 engine used in the previous generation is no longer offered in Japan, neither is the succeeding VK56VD V8 which is only found on the Fuga's North American counterpart, the Infiniti M56. The larger 5.6L engine incurs a higher rate of road tax liability which hampers sales. The VQ35HR 3.5 L V6 Hybrid is now the Fuga's third engine option, utilizing the Atkinson cycle. The electric motor, installed in parallel between the engine and the transmission, produces  from 1.3kWh lithium-ion batteries that are expected to have a service life of 10 years. The batteries are installed upright behind the rear seats. The Fuga Hybrid introduced Nissan's first in-house developed electric hybrid technology, and Nissan claims it will double the fuel economy of its gasoline-powered version.

A driving mode selector knob has been installed as standard equipment on all models, situated below the transmission gear lever and between the heated and ventilated front seat controls, providing four selections labeled "Standard", "Sport", "Eco", and "Snow", allowing the 7-speed transmission, engine and various systems to optimize driving based on varying conditions. To minimize exhaust noise intrusion into the passenger compartment from the engine at low RPMs, "Active Noise Control" has been installed. Double-piston shock absorbers, developed by Kayaba Industry Company, have replaced the ones previously supplied by Hitachi.

Trim levels offered in Japan start with the 250GT, 250GT Type P, 250GT "A" package; 370GT, 370GT FOUR (AWD), 370GT FOUR (AWD) "A" package, 370GT Type S, with the 370VIP at the top of the range. The 370GT Type S uses 20" Bridgestone Potenza RE050A 245/40 tires, with other trim packages using Dunlop SP Sport Maxx TT 245/50 tires on 18" with all wheels consisting of aluminum alloy.

Some of the optional interior equipment includes heated and ventilated front seats, a 16 speaker Bose "studio surround" audio system, power reclining rear seats, power ottoman for the rear passenger opposite the driver, and HDD navigation combined with a telematics subscription service called "CarWings" in Japan.

Safety technology has also been introduced, such as Lane Departure Prevention, which uses a small camera mounted above the rearview mirror to gauge distance from the lane markers, and will lightly tap selected brakes when necessary to help ease the car back into the correct lane. It will allow for unimpeded lane changes when the turn signal is used, and will yield control to the driver at all times.

Blind Spot Intervention System uses sensors to provide a visual warning in the side view mirror. If the car senses that movement towards the obstacle is occurring, it will provide an audible warning and will apply opposite side brakes to guide the vehicle into the correct lane.

The Nissan Fuga Hybrid, together with the Nissan Leaf, will include Nissan's new Vehicle Sound for Pedestrians system to alert pedestrians, the blind and others to their presence when the hybrid is operating at low speeds in all-electric mode.

It was announced on March 31, 2022 that Nissan is planning to end production of the Fuga.

Engines

References

 Automobil Revue, Katalognummer 2006 (Technical data)
 Nissan Fuga: Japanese sales brochure, Print Reference C2108-1201AAA, 2007 (Data 450 GT and Prices)

External links

Nissan Japan pages: early, current

Fuga
Rear-wheel-drive vehicles
All-wheel-drive vehicles
Luxury vehicles
Mid-size cars
Executive cars
Flagship vehicles
Cars introduced in 2004
Vehicles with four-wheel steering
Hybrid electric cars
2010s cars